Sphingobacterium wenxiniae is a Gram-negative, non-spore-forming bacterium from the genus of Sphingobacterium which has b een isolated from activated sludge from a wastewater treatment plant in China. Sphingobacterium wenxiniae has the ability to degrade cypermethrin.

References

External links
Type strain of Sphingobacterium wenxiniae at BacDive -  the Bacterial Diversity Metadatabase	

Sphingobacteriia
Bacteria described in 2012